Vijayanagara district is a district in the southern Indian state of Karnataka, located in the Kalyana-Karnataka region. The city of Hosapete is its headquarters.

Vijayanagara was officially carved out of Bellary on 2 October 2021 to become the 31st district of the state with Hosapete as the district headquarters. It is home to Hampi, the former capital of the famous Vijayanagara Empire and a UNESCO World Heritage site, and several historical places are located in the district.

History
During late-mediaeval India, the region comprising present-day Vijayanagara district was the seat of the Vijayanagara Empire. During British Rule, it was part of Madras presidency. After India's independence, during the organisation of Indian states in the Republic of India, with the formation Andhra Pradesh in 1953, the Vijayanagara region became part of Bellary district of the newly formed Mysore state. In 2020, six divisions were planned to be split up from Bellary and form out of them a new district. During the 2020 premiership of B. S. Yediyurappa, the government of Karnataka approved the plan and notified the formation of Vijayanagara district on 18 November 2020, thus making it the 31st district of Karnataka.

At present, Vijayanagara district is part of the Kalyana Karnataka region.

Administration
Vijayanagara district comprises six divisions, two subdivisions, and 18 village clusters. Hosapete is the administrative headquarters of the district.

Anand Singh, MLA from Vijayanagara, was appointed as the district's minister in charge for the state government.

Parliament and assembly seats 
In the national legislature's lower house, Vijayanagara district is part of Bellary Constituency (reserved for scheduled tribes), except for Harapanahalli, which is part of Davanagere Constituency.

In state legislature's lower house, Vijayanagara district has five assembly seats: Harapanahalli; Hagaribommanahalli (scheduled castes); Vijayanagara; Kudligi (scheduled tribes); and Hadagalli (scheduled castes).

Tourism

Tungabhadra Dam, in Hospet, over Tungabhadra River
Hampi: known for the ruins of Vijayanagara. A world heritage site, which attracts hundreds of thousands of people from across the world every year, is situated in this district. It is home to several ruined structures.
Mylara: Mylara Lingeshwara Temple is a Hindu temple dedicated to God Mylara, who is believed to be a form of Lord Krishna. Located at the center of Karnataka, it is in the extreme south-western corner of Hoovina Hadagali, of Vijayanagara District.
Tungabhadra River, viewing Point.
Makanadaku A remote village located in the Kudligi taluk hosts for Kanchobaleshwara Temple a unique Ugra Narasimha who was presiding deity for various palegar during Vijayanagar empire It's Magnificent temple attracts everyone by Vijayanagara temple style Gopurams
Kotturu: Sri Guru Kotturubasaveshwara Temple is a Hindu temple dedicated to God Sri Guru Basaveshwara. Located at the town of Kotturu, of Vijayanagara District.
Bagali, Harapanahalli: Bagali Basaveshwara is a Hindu temple from ancient times. It is a very attractive place. Located near SH-25, Hospet Main Road, 8 km away from Harapanahalli City of Vijayanagara District.
Koolahalli, Harapanahalli: Koolahalli Basaveshwara
Neelagunda, Harapanahall

Education
Kannada University, a research-oriented public university, is situated in Hampi. The university was founded by the government of Karnataka during the premiership of S. Bangarappa with the aim to develop the Kannada language and to promote its literature and traditions.

References